Köprübaşı is a village in Anamur district of Mersin Province, Turkey. It has almost merged to Çeltikçi, a town lying to the north east of Anamur. The population is 1107  as of 2011.

References

Villages in Anamur District